Jermaine Bucknor (born November 1, 1983) is a Canadian professional basketball coach and former player, who played at the small forward position. He is currently working as assistant coach for Gladiators Trier of the German ProA.

Career 
The 6 ft 7 inch Edmonton native played college basketball at the University of Richmond.

Further, he gained experience with the French basketball teams Limoges CSP Elite, Étoile Sportive Saint-Michel Le Portel Côte d'Opale (aka ESSM Le Portel), Aix-Maurienne Savoie Basket and Stade Clermontois Basket Auvergne, and Polish team Polpak Świecie.

Starting in 2012, he played for TBB Trier in the German Basketball Bundesliga. In 2014, he extended his contract with the Trier team for two more years. Following stints in Belgium and Argentina, Bucknor returned to the city of Trier, signing with the Gladiators Trier. Chronic knee pain and a hip injury forced him to retire in June 2021. Bucknor opted to start a career in coaching.

Coaching career
Following retirement, he has started his coaching career by becoming assistant coach for Gladiators Trier of the German ProA.

International career 
Bucknor has represented Canada Basketball for four years and played 25 games with the Canadian National Program.  Bucknor last represented Canada at the 2007 Pan American Games where he averaged 7.5 points and 2.8 rebounds in four games played.

Personal
On July 10, 2011, Jermaine wed singer-songwriter Bethany Holtby.

References

External links 
Belgian League profile
Eurobasket.com Profile
FIBA.com Profile

1983 births
Living people
2010 FIBA World Championship players
Aix Maurienne Savoie Basket players
Basketball people from Alberta
Basketball players at the 2007 Pan American Games
Belfius Mons-Hainaut players
Black Canadian basketball players
Canadian expatriate basketball people in Belgium
Canadian expatriate basketball people in France
Canadian expatriate basketball people in Germany
Canadian expatriate basketball people in Poland
Canadian expatriate basketball people in the United States
Ciclista Olímpico players
ESSM Le Portel players
Libertad de Sunchales basketball players
Limoges CSP players
Pan American Games competitors for Canada
Richmond Spiders men's basketball players
S.Oliver Würzburg players
Skyliners Frankfurt players
Small forwards
Sportspeople from Edmonton